Lingadahalli is a village in Tarikere Taluk, Chikkamagaluru district, Karnataka, India. Lingadahalli is one of the prominent pre-historic sites in Karnataka state.

Demographics
Lingayatism is the major religion in the area.  There are many different religions practiced in this village, so the village is known for religious tolerance and understanding.

The name Lingadahalli comes from the Lingayat community, the largest part of the population of the community. The VeeraShiva legend is a part of this area's culture, although Brahmins and the Koushika Sankethi group comprise a large part of the community. Sankethi is the major tribe among Brahmins.

Virabadreshvara Temple and Ramamandira  temple of lord Rama are at the heart of the town.

The village is a hobli and scenic hills of Kemmanagundi and Kalhathigiri Falls (where the Lord VeeraBhadreshvara resides) are around 10 km from the village. Lingadahalli is a roadmap to Karnataka tourism, nearby places are Sanna Hebbe falls and Dodda Hebbe falls, Shanthi falls, mruthapura temple, Lakkavalli Bhadra Dam, Sri Dattatreya peeta (Baba budan giri), Mullayyanagiri and Bhadra reserve forest. The whole area covered by many hills and coffee estates. Linagadahalli also famous for people like, Late Sri Veda Brahma Narasimha Murthy a pandith in vedas, winner of the Veda Ratna award and also Lingadahalli Subrahmanya Shashidhara, an Indian developmental biologist who has also received Shanti Swarup Bhatnagar Prize. 
Agriculture is the main industry in this area and common perennial crops grown are areca nut, coconut and banana. The main annual crops grown are beans, green peas, potatoes, and chili peppers.

See also
Lingadahalli is a Hobli Centre In Tarikere Taluk.
Basava
Vachanas
Veeragase
Shakthi-VishistaAdvaitha
Sankethi language

References

Villages in Chikkamagaluru district